Oracle is an album by American jazz bassist Gary Peacock and guitarist Ralph Towner, recorded in 1993 and released on the ECM label.

Reception 
The AllMusic review by Scott Yanow stated: "There is a surprising amount of ferocious interplay between the two musicians. They may play at a consistently low volume, but the set of originals has a few rather passionate grooves and a little more energy than one would have predicted".

Track listing 
All compositions by Gary Peacock except as indicated
 "Gaya" - 5:45   
 "Flutter Step" - 5:45   
 "Empty Carrousel"  5:48   
 "Hat and Cane" (Ralph Towner) - 5:12   
 "Inside Inside" - 5:55   
 "St. Helens" - 1:52   
 "Oracle" (Peacock, Towner) - 7:20   
 "Burly Hello" - 5:53   
 "Tramonto" (Towner) - 6:21
Recorded at Rainbow Studio in Oslo, Norway in May 1993.

Personnel
 Gary Peacock — bass
 Ralph Towner — classical guitar, 12 string guitar

References 

ECM Records albums
Gary Peacock albums
Ralph Towner albums
1994 albums
Albums produced by Manfred Eicher